Shahnaz Rushdieh also known as Shahnaz Azad, (19011961), was a journalist and a pioneer of the women's movement in Iran. She was also the editor of the Women's Letter.

Early life 
Shahnaz was born in a cultural and middle class family in Tabriz city . Her father Haji-Mirza Hassan Roshdieh was a well-educated and a schoolboy. During her youth years, she married Abolqasem Azad Maraghi, who was a journalist. In the year 1920, before the age of 20, she also published the Women's Letter for women's awareness in Iran about their rights. She published articles on women's rights, hijab, national and international news, and all her articles were written for women. Shahnaz along with her husband, were faced with harassment, imprisonment and exile, shortage of funds and financial problems for the publication of their Newspapers.

Death 
Shahnaz Azad died at the age of 60 in 1961.

See also
 Women in Constitutional Revolution
 Persian Constitutional Revolution    
 Women's rights movement in Iran
 Women's rights in Iran

Notes

References 
 Eliz Sanasarian. The Women's Rights Movements in Iran. 1982, Rebellion, decline and repression from 1901 to the 1979 revolution, First print, Tehran:  Akhtaran Publishing House 2005,(طغیان، افول و سرکوب از ۱۲۸۰ تا انقلاب ۱۳۵۷) . (Original from the University of Michigan)
 Pooran Faroukhzad, Iranian women's labors (from yesterday to today) Tehran: Qatar Newspaper 2002.کارنمای زنان کارای ایران (از دیروز تا امروز)  .

1901 births
1961 deaths
Iranian women's rights activists
Iranian feminists
Iranian women journalists